Robbert Hendrik van Mesdag (18 January 1930 – 18 July 2018) was a Dutch rower who won a bronze medal in the single sculls at the 1955 European Rowing Championships. He competed in this event at the 1952 Summer Olympics, but failed to reach the final.

References

1930 births
2018 deaths
Dutch male rowers
Olympic rowers of the Netherlands
Rowers at the 1952 Summer Olympics
Sportspeople from Hilversum
European Rowing Championships medalists
20th-century Dutch people
21st-century Dutch people